Renzong is the temple name used for several emperors of China. It may refer to:

Emperor Renzong of Song (1010–1063, reigned 1022–1063), emperor of the Song dynasty
Emperor Renzong of Western Xia (1124–1193, reigned 1139–1193), emperor of Western Xia
Yelü Yilie (died 1163, reigned 1150–1163), emperor of Qara Khitai (Western Liao)
Ayurbarwada Buyantu Khan (1285–1320, reigned 1311–1320), emperor of the Yuan dynasty
Hongxi Emperor (1378–1425, reigned 1424–1425), emperor of the Ming dynasty
Jiaqing Emperor (1760–1820, reigned 1796–1820), emperor of the Qing dynasty

See also 
Injong (disambiguation), Korean equivalent
Nhân Tông (disambiguation), Vietnamese equivalent

Temple name disambiguation pages